The Venus (German: Die Venus) is a 1922 Austrian silent film directed by Hans Homma and starring Raoul Aslan, Magda Sonja and Nora Gregor.

Cast
 Raoul Aslan as Paul Greville 
 Magda Sonja as Gräfin 
 Nora Gregor as Yvonne 
 Louis Nerz as Graf 
 Franz Everth as Juan Salvador 
 Robert Balajthy

References

Bibliography
 Paolo Caneppele & Günter Krenn. Elektrische Schatten. Filmarchiv Austria, 1999.

External links

1922 films
Austrian silent feature films
Films directed by Hans Homma
Austrian black-and-white films
Films based on works by Prosper Mérimée
Films set in France